The 1957–58 Serie C was the twentieth edition of Serie C, the third highest league in the Italian football league system.
There were no relegations in order to expand and create two geographic groups. The expansion was needed to reduce the costs of away matches.

Final classification

Serie C seasons
3
Italy